The Tel Aviv Municipal LGBT Center (Hebrew: המרכז העירוני לקהילה הגאה, HaMerkaz HaIroni LaKehila HaGe'a) is a municipal establishment, housing various social and cultural community services provided by the City of Tel Aviv to the local lesbian, gay, bi and trans community. The center is located in a restored Bauhaus building in Meir Park at the city center.

Building
The building currently housing the LGBT Center is at the southern end of Meir Park at the city center, off King George Street. Built in 1920, it was used first as a school and later as a HaNoar HaOved VeHaLomed branch. With no surrounding wall or fence, the building opens directly onto the park. The ground floor and terrace include a popular cafe, as well as an auditorium, reception desk and unisex bathrooms. The three upper floors include a meeting room and several rooms used for community activities, including an indoor playground for toddlers, rehearsal room for theater groups, the offices of several LGBT organizations and a health care clinic of the Clalit HMO, focusing on LGBT needs but open to the general public.

The garden surrounding the building includes a memorial to the victims of the 2009 Tel Aviv gay centre shooting, and a memorial to LGBT victims of Nazi persecution.

Activities
The center is a municipal agency, funded by the Tel Aviv-Yafo Municipality, which spent NIS 4 million on the building's refurbishment and conversion. It opened its doors in 2008, following a 2004 survey mapping the needs of the LGBT community. Activities fall under six main categories: 
Cultural programs including theatre, dance, concerts, etc.
Social events
Community organizations for LGBT youth, parents of LGBT persons, religious groups, transsexuals, seniors, people with HIV, etc. 
Support services: legal, medical, psychological aid, hotline, childcare, etc.
Learning: lectures and workshops
Leisure: enrichment activities. The cafe serves as a safe meeting place

External links

 Official website 
 IGY: The Israel Gay Youth Organization 

LGBT culture in Tel Aviv
Buildings and structures in Tel Aviv
LGBT organizations in Israel
LGBT community centres